Walter Vaz Correa (born 24 May 1990) is a French professional footballer who plays as a forward for Hong Kong First Division club South China.

Career
Vaz began his career in 2014 with River Plate Montevideo, where he started playing early in 2014.

He was signed by Hong Kong Rangers in December 2017 but terminated his contract with the club in the following month.

On 7 April 2018, Vaz appeared in his first match for Swedish club Härnösands.

Personal life
Vaz is of Bissau-Guinean descent.

References

External links
 
 Interview to Walter Vaz – Fox Sports Uruguay 

1990 births
Living people
French people of Bissau-Guinean descent
Sportspeople from Aube
French footballers
Footballers from Grand Est
Association football forwards
Uruguayan Primera División players
Club Atlético River Plate (Montevideo) players
El Tanque Sisley players
Southern District FC players
Hong Kong Rangers FC players
Härnösands FF players
Happy Valley AA players
South China AA players
French expatriate footballers
French expatriate sportspeople in Uruguay
Expatriate footballers in Uruguay
French expatriate sportspeople in Hong Kong
Expatriate footballers in Hong Kong
French expatriate sportspeople in Sweden
Expatriate footballers in Sweden
French expatriate sportspeople in Greece
Expatriate footballers in Greece